General Anton may refer to:

Constantin Anton (1894–1993), Romanian Armed Forces brigadier general
Prince Karl Anton of Hohenzollern (1868–1919), Prussian Army lieutenant general
Paul II Anton, Prince Esterházy (1711–1762), Holy Roman Empire general
Werner Anton (1895–1948), German Luftwaffe lieutenant general